Giant is the debut album by British rock band The Woodentops.

The album reached #35 on the UK albums chart, spending 4 weeks on the chart.

The album featured in the 1986 end of year critics polls in the NME and Melody Maker at numbers 36 and 16 respectively.

Track listing
All tracks composed by Rolo McGinty.
"Get It On"
"Good Thing"
"Give It Time"
"Love Train"
"Hear Me James"
"Love Affair with Everyday Living"
"So Good Today"
"Shout"
"History"
"Travelling Man"
"Last Time"
"Everything Breaks"

Personnel
The Woodentops
Rolo McGinty – vocals, guitar
Frank de Freitas – bass, voice
Simon Mawby – guitar, voice
Benny Staples – drums, voice
Alice Thompson – keyboards, voice
with:
Chucho Merchan - double bass
Jack Emblow - accordion
Bob Sargeant - marimba 
Steve Sidwell - trumpet
Danny Schogger - strings

References

1986 debut albums
The Woodentops albums
Rough Trade Records albums
Albums produced by Bob Sargeant